This is a list of notable alumni of the University of Missouri in Columbia, Missouri.

Academic
George E. Bates (B.A., M.A.), Professor of Investment Management at the Harvard Business School; editor of the Harvard Business Review
Thomas Curtright (B.S. 1970, M.S. 1970), Professor of Physics at University of Miami
Walter Dandy (B.S. 1907), Professor of Medicine at Johns Hopkins University School of Medicine; considered a founding father of modern neurosurgery.
Robert P. Foster (M.A., PhD), President of Northwest Missouri State University (1964–1977)
Robert J. Jones (PhD 1978), Chancellor at the University of Illinois at Urbana-Champaign and former president at the University of Albany
Uel W. Lamkin (attended), President of Northwest Missouri State University (1921–1945)
Robin Luke (PhD Business Administration and Marketing), Professor and Department Head, Marketing Department, Missouri State University; previously a 1950s pop music singer, best known for the 1958 hit "Susie Darlin'"
Matthew Kroenig (BA), Associate Professor of Government and Foreign Service at Georgetown University
John C. McManus (PhD), military historian, author, and professor of military history at the Missouri University of Science and Technology
Francis Joseph Mullin, president of Shimer College
Donald E. Pease (BA 1968, MA 1969), Professor of English and Comparative Literature at Dartmouth College 
Mohammad Shahidehpour, Carl Bodine Distinguished Professor and Chairman in the Electrical and Computer Engineering Department at Illinois Institute of Technology
Mason Vaugh (BS 1919, B.Eng 1921), founder and Head of the Department of Agricultural Engineering in Allahabad Agricultural Institute
Lawrence Walkup (MA 1942, PhD 1948), President of Northern Arizona University
Todd Whitaker (BS 1981, M.Ed. 1985, PhD 1992), Professor of Educational Leadership, Indiana State University

Arts, film, and literature

Tom Berenger, actor, Major League, The Big Chill, Platoon
Linda Bloodworth-Thomason, writer and television producer
Neal E. Boyd (BA 2001), opera singer; winner ofAmerica's Got Talent in 2008
Brent Briscoe MU 1984, actor
Hal Call, pioneering LGBT rights activist and gay publisher/pornographer
Kate Capshaw (BS 1975, MEd 1977, ΑΔΠ), actress, Willie Scott in Indiana Jones and the Temple of Doom
Chris Cooper (BGS 1976), Academy Award-winning actor, Adaptation
Candice Crawford (BJ 2009, ΠΒΦ), Miss Missouri and Miss USA finalist; reporter for KDAF-TV
Sheryl Crow (BS Ed 1984, ΚΑΘ, ΟΔΚ, SAI), musician, singer-songwriter
Jeffery Deaver (BJ 1972), author Lincoln Rhyme series
Hope Driskill (BA 2012, ΧΩ), Survivor: Caramoan, Miss Missouri USA 2011 and Miss USA Top 16 finalist
Dave Fogel (ΣΧ, radio disc jockey)
Jon Hamm (BA 1993), actor, Don Draper of AMC's Mad Men
William Least Heat-Moon (BA 1961, MA 1962, PhD 1973, BJ 1978, ΤΚΕ), author
Rebecca Johns (BA 1993, BJ 1993), author
David Koechner, actor, Todd Packer of The Office, Champ Kind of Anchorman
Robert Loggia (BJ 1951 ΑΣΦ), actor, Jagged Edge, Big, Scarface, The Sopranos
Harris Merton Lyon, short-story writer
Richard Matheson (BJ 1949, ΦΜΑ), screenwriter, author of I Am Legend, The Shrinking Man, What Dreams May Come
Marijane Meaker (BA 1949 ΑΔΠ), novelist
Greg Miller (BJ 2005), IGN cast member, host of Up at Noon, co-founder of Kinda Funny
Pamela Morsi, author
Suniti Namjoshi, writer
Brad Pitt (ΣΧ, Journalism School, remains one credit short of graduation), actor and producer
James Rollins, aka James Czajkowski, author of bestselling Sigma Force series
SallyAnn Salsano, producer and creator of reality television shows for MTV including Jersey Shore
Ed Sanders (dropout 1958), poet, lead singer of the Fugs, social activist, author
Betty Scarpino, wood sculptor
George C. Scott, Academy Award-winning actor, Patton, Dr. Strangelove, The Hustler, Anatomy of a Murder
Beatriz Sheridan, Mexican telenovela producer/director noted for Televisa
Mort Walker (BA 1948, ΚΣ), cartoonist; a life-sized bronze statue of his creation Beetle Bailey sits in front of alumni center; restaurant in student center is named Mort's
George Woodward Warder (BA circa 1866), eccentric lawyer, real estate speculator, poet, philosopher, cosmologist
John Edward Williams (PHD 1954), recipient of National Book Award, author of Stoner and Augustus
Tennessee Williams (ΑΤΩ), playwright, The Glass Menagerie, A Streetcar Named Desire, Cat on a Hot Tin Roof
Ying Da, actor and director

Athletics

Baseball

Joe Bennett, MLB player
Phil Bradley (Mystical 7), former MLB player, also played football
Skip Caray, former broadcaster for Atlanta Braves; son of Harry Caray
Jeff Cornell, former MLB pitcher
Aaron Crow, MLB pitcher
John Dettmer, former MLB pitcher
David Freese, former MLB third baseman-first baseman, 2011 NLCS and World Series MVP and Babe Ruth Award winner for St. Louis Cardinals
Kyle Gibson, MLB All-Star pitcher for Philadelphia Phillies
Ian Kinsler, former All-Star MLB second baseman
Tim Laudner former MLB catcher 
Reggie McClain, MLB pitcher for the Seattle Mariners
Dave Otto, former MLB pitcher
Max Scherzer, MLB All-Star pitcher for Los Angeles Dodgers, 3-time Cy Young Award winner (2013, 2016, 2017)
Jerry Schoonmaker, former MLB outfielder, also played football 
Art Shamsky, former MLB outfielder and Israel Baseball League manager
Mike Shannon (attended), MLB infielder for St. Louis Cardinals, 2-time World Series champion and broadcaster
Sonny Siebert, former MLB pitcher, 2-time All-Star
Dave Silvestri, former MLB infielder
Gene Stephenson, former Wichita State University baseball head coach, also played football 
Nick Tepesch, pitcher for Texas Rangers
Jayce Tingler, manager for San Diego Padres

Basketball
Jabari Brown, CBA player for Foshan Dralions
John Brown, former NBA player for Atlanta Hawks, Chicago Bulls
DeMarre Carroll, current NBA player for San Antonio Spurs
Jordan Clarkson, current NBA player for Utah Jazz
Sophie Cunningham, current WNBA player for Phoenix Mercury and current WNBL player for Melbourne Boomers
Marcus Denmon, TBL player for Istanbul BB
Keyon Dooling, former NBA player for Boston Celtics
Larry Drew, former NBA player, former head coach for Atlanta Hawks and Milwaukee Bucks
Al Eberhard, former NBA player for Detroit Pistons
Kim English, former NBA player
Thomas Gardner, former NBA player for Atlanta Hawks
Linas Kleiza, former NBA player
Gary Leonard, former NBA player
Anthony Peeler, former NBA player for Los Angeles Lakers 
Michael Porter Jr., No.14 pick of 2018 NBA Draft, NBA player for Denver Nuggets
Phil Pressey, former NBA player for Boston Celtics
Kareem Rush, former NBA player for Los Angeles Clippers
Doug Smith, former NBA player
Norm Stewart (BA 1956, ΒΘΠ, Mystical 7), All-American and former head coach at Northern Iowa (1961–67) and Mizzou (1967–99)
Steve Stipanovich, former NBA player
Jon Sundvold, former NBA player for San Antonio Spurs, Miami Heat

Football

Bud Abell, former American Football League player for the Kansas City Chiefs
Danario Alexander, former NFL player for San Diego Chargers
Russ Ball, executive with Green Bay Packers
Gary Barnett (1969, ΒΘΠ), former head football coach at Northwestern and Colorado
Dwayne Blakley, former NFL tight end
Justin Britt, offensive lineman for Seattle Seahawks
Charlie Brown, NFL player for New Orleans Saints
Colin Brown, NFL player for Buffalo Bills
Lloyd Carr (ΚΣ), former head coach University of Michigan
Byron Chamberlain, former NFL player
Paul Christman (ΚΣ), College Football Hall of Famer, former NFL player and broadcaster
Chase Coffman, NFL player, John Mackey Award winner
DeMontie Cross, assistant coach with Wisconsin Badgers
Sean Culkin, NFL player
Chase Daniel, NFL player for Chicago Bears
Robert Delpino, former NFL player
Kony Ealy, defensive lineman for New York Jets
Brad Edelman, former NFL player
Atiyyah Ellison, NFL player for Kansas City Chiefs
Don Faurot (1924 Farmhouse, Mystical 7), MU coach and player
Ron Fellows, former NFL player
Will Franklin, former NFL player
Blaine Gabbert, NFL player for Arizona Cardinals
Andrew Gachkar, NFL player with San Diego Chargers
Justin Gage, former NFL player
E.J. Gaines, NFL player for Los Angeles Rams
Tony Galbreath, former NFL player
Markus Golden, NFL player for Arizona Cardinals
Mel Gray (Mystical 7), former NFL player
Dorial Green-Beckham, NFL player for Tennessee Titans
Ziggy Hood, NFL player for Jacksonville Jaguars
Harry Ice (ΒΘΠ), MVP of 1942 Sugar Bowl, longtime member of athletic department
Brad Imes, football player; appeared on The Ultimate Fighter 2, retired professional mixed martial arts fighter
Jim Jennings, former NFL player
Mike Jones, former NFL player
Henry Josey, former NFL player
Jim Kekeris, former NFL player
Jim Leavitt, former head coach of University of South Florida
Leo Lewis, former NFL player
Drew Lock, NFL player for Denver Broncos
Rick Lyle, former NFL player
Bill McCartney, former head coach at University of Colorado
Jeremy Maclin, NFL player for Kansas City Chiefs
Henry Marshall, former NFL player
Steve Martin, former NFL player
John Matuszak, former NFL player for Oakland Raiders
Ron McBride, former NFL player
Erik McMillan, former NFL player
William Moore, NFL player for Atlanta Falcons
Mitch Morse, NFL player for Kansas City Chiefs
C. J. Mosley, NFL player for Cleveland Browns
Damien Nash, former NFL player
Brock Olivo, former NFL player
Gus Otto (ΒΘΠ), former NFL player
Francis Peay, former NFL player
Kurt Petersen, former NFL player
Johnnie Poe, former NFL player
Shane Ray, NFL player for Denver Broncos
Howard Richards (Kappa Alpha Psi), former NFL player, Dallas Cowboys
Johnny Roland (Kappa Alpha Psi), former NFL coach and player
Martin Rucker, NFL player for Philadelphia Eagles
Andy Russell, former NFL player
Jerome Sally, former NFL player
Michael Sam, former NFL player for St. Louis Rams, first openly gay player in NFL
George Seals, former NFL player
Aldon Smith, NFL player for San Francisco 49ers
Brad Smith, NFL player for Philadelphia Eagles
Justin Smith, NFL player for San Francisco 49ers
Otis Smith, former NFL player
Ray Smith, NFL player
David Smukler, NFL player
Hugh Sprinkle, NFL player
Stryker Sulak, NFL player for Green Bay Packers
Morris Towns, former NFL player
Bruce Van Dyke, former NFL player
L'Damian Washington, wide receiver for San Francisco 49ers
Russ Washington, former NFL player
Sean Weatherspoon, NFL player for Atlanta Falcons
Roger Wehrli, seven-time Pro Bowl NFL player in Pro Football Hall of Fame
Bill Whitaker, former NFL player
James Wilder Sr., former NFL player
Kellen Winslow, college and Pro Football Hall of Fame player
Eric Wright, former NFL player

Other
 Ben Askren, two-time NCAA wrestling champion (2006,2007); 2008 Olympian; retired MMA fighter; former Bellator Welterweight Champion
 Karissa Schweizer, Professional Runner, seven-time NCAA National Champion
 Chelsea Thomas, American Softball Player, SEC Pitcher of the Year
 Dick Ault, Olympic hurdler
 Evan Bourne, professional wrestler
 Christian Cantwell, shot putter, 2004 IAAF World Indoor Champion, 2008 Olympic silver medalist, 2009 IAAF World Outdoor Champion
 Michael Chandler, 2009 NCAA Wrestling All-American (5th place 157 lbs.), former Bellator Lightweight Champion
 J'den Cox, three-time NCAA champion wrestler, 2016 Olympic bronze medalist in 86 kg weight class
 Carl Edwards, NASCAR driver and 2007 Busch Series champion (attended but did not graduate)
 Sammie Henson, two-time NCAA wrestling champion; 1998 world freestyle champion; 2000 Olympic silver medalist; 2006 world bronze medalist at age 36
 Ross Miner (born 1991), skating coach and retired competitive figure skater
 Derrick Peterson (ΑΚΛ), professional runner, 2004 Olympian
 J. P. Reese, two-time NCAA wrestling championships qualifier (2002 and 2003); MMA fighter
 Gene Snitsky, professional wrestler
 Mike Whitehead (attended), three-time All-American wrestler; MMA fighter
 Tyron Woodley, two-time NCAA Division I All-American wrestler; mixed martial artist in welterweight division, champion for Ultimate Fighting Championship

Business
Andrew Cherng (MS 1972), founder of Panda Express and chairman of Panda Restaurant Group
James H. Faulkner, Alabama politician, newspaper publisher, and business leader
Alan C. Greenberg (BS BA 1949, ZBT), Chairman, Bear Stearns Companies
Edward D. "Ted" Jones (1947), managing partner of Edward Jones Investments
R. Crosby Kemper (AB 1914, ΒΘΠ), former President and Chairman, United Missouri Bancshares
R. Crosby Kemper, Jr. (AB 1949, ΒΘΠ), former President and Chairman, United Missouri Bancshares
Richard Kinder (BA 1966, JD 1968, ΣΝ, QEBH), Chairman and CEO of Kinder Morgan; former President of Enron; net worth of $10.2 billion; #39 on 2013 Forbes 400 list of richest Americans
E. Stanley Kroenke (BS BA 1971, MBA 1973), Chairman of THF Realty; owner of NBA's Denver Nuggets and NHL's Colorado Avalanche; co-owner of NFL's Los Angeles Rams; majority shareholder Arsenal FC; net worth of $3.5 billion, tied for #105 on 2008 Forbes 400 list of richest Americans
Kenneth Lay (BA 1964, MA 1965, ΒΘΠ, ΟΔΚ, ΦΒΚ), former CEO of Enron
Harry J. Lloyd (BJ 1950, TKE), founder of House of Lloyd and the upscale Loch Lloyd village and country club near Kansas City
David C. Novak (BJ 1974, ΔΥ), Chairman, CEO, and President, Yum! Brands, Inc.
Rodger O. Riney (BS CiE 1968, MBA 1969, XE), founder of Scottrade, deep-discount brokerage firm
Matthew K. Rose (BS BA 1981, ΛΧΑ), Chairman, CEO, and President, Burlington Northern Santa Fe
 Roger Straus (1917–2004), co-founder and chairman of Farrar, Straus and Giroux
Samuel M. Walton (BA 1940, ΒΘΠ, QEBH), founder of Walmart

Journalism
John Anderson (BJ 1987), ESPN SportsCenter host
Lori Borgman, nationally distributed columnist, author and speaker
Gerald M. Boyd, former Managing Editor of New York Times, first African-American metropolitan editor and managing editor at Times
Russ Buettner, Pulitzer Prize winning investigative reporter for The New York Times
Barney Calame (ΒΘΠ), Public Editor, New York Times
Jann Carl (BJ 1982, ΚΚΓ), television personality, Entertainment Tonight
Papa Joe Chevalier, host of nationally syndicated Papa Joe Show on the Sporting News Radio Network until 2005 
Sophia Choi, television anchor at CNN Headline News
Kelly Crull, sports anchor and reporter, Fox Sports South
Clifton C. Edom (BJ 1946), Mizzou photojournalism educator and co-founder of Pictures of the Year, Missouri Photo Workshop, and Kappa Alpha Mu
Clarence Faulk (BJ c. 1931), publisher of Ruston Daily Leader, founder of radio station KRUS, and diversified businessman in Ruston, Louisiana
Pat Forde, Yahoo Sports columnist
Martin Frost (BJ 1964, ZBT), political commentator, Fox News Channel
Major Garrett (BJ 1984), national correspondent, Fox News Channel
Jay Greenberg, sports journalist and winner of the Elmer Ferguson Memorial Award
Mike Hall, first winner of ESPN Dream Job series
Tom Hart, play-by-play commentator for SEC Network and ESPN
Sarah Hollins, (BA 2013), Miss Nebraska USA 2016, TV personality 
Robert Horner (BJ 1970), president of NBC News Channel
Juliet Huddy, Fox News Channel host
Jeffrey Crawford Jones, radio host 
James J. Kilpatrick (BJ 1941), conservative columnist
Michael Kim, ESPNEWS host
Ah Jook Ku (1935), former Associated Press correspondent, first Asian American female reporter for Honolulu Star-Bulletin
Jim Lehrer (ΣΔΧ award), PBS news anchor
David Limbaugh (BA 1975, JD 1978), political commentator and author
Andrea Mackris, Fox News television producer
Joel Meyers, sportscaster
Thomas Franklin Fairfax Millard (ΒΘΠ), journalist
Russ Mitchell (BJ 1982), weekend anchor, CBS Evening News
Jonathan Murray (BJ 1977), executive producer and co-creator of MTV's The Real World
Lisa Myers (BJ 1973), television journalist, former senior investigative correspondent, NBC News
Ken Paulson, editor, USA Today
Marjorie Paxson, influential women's page editor
Doc Quigg, journalist for United Press International
Elle Reeve (BJ 2005), correspondent for Vice News
Chuck Roberts (BJ 1971), CNN news anchor
Ben Robertson (1926), WW II war correspondent, New York Herald Tribune; author
Charles Griffith Ross, press secretary for President Harry S. Truman
Jon Scott, Fox News Channel anchor
Brad Sham (BJ 1970, ΑΕΠ), Dallas Cowboys Radio Network host
Ram Subhag Singh – Indian Politician, first Leader of the Opposition in Lok Sabha
Brendan Smialowski, photojournalist
Edgar Snow (ΒΘΠ), main Western journalist in Mao's China
Lee Strobel (BJ 1974), journalist and author of The Case for Christ series
Bob Sullivan, author and founding member of MSNBC
Wright Thompson, ESPN senior writer
Elizabeth Vargas (BJ 1984), former ABC News anchor/correspondent and 20/20 co-anchor
Matt Winer (BJ 1991, ΠΚΑ), ESPN SportsCenter host
Nick Young, CBS radio news anchor

Government and law
Huda Salih Mahdi Ammash (PHD 1983), also known as Chemical Sally; Iraqi scientist and microbiologist; former member of Iraq's Revolutionary Command Council
Emily Newell Blair, writer, suffragist, national Democratic Party political leader, co-founder of the League of Women Voters, feminist
Russ Carnahan (BS 1979, JD 1983, KA), U.S. Congressman
Paul Coverdell (ΦΚΨ), former U.S. Senator (GA); died 2000
William S. Cowherd (1881, ΒΘΠ), former Democratic mayor of Kansas City, Missouri in 1892–1893 and U.S. Congressman from Missouri in 1897–1905
William B. Cravens (1893, ΒΘΠ), former U.S. Representative from Missouri
Thomas T. Crittenden Jr. (1882, ΒΘΠ), former mayor of Kansas City, Missouri from 1908–1909
Elgin English Crull (1930, Kappa Sigma), longest serving city manager of Dallas, Texas to date (1952–1966); city manager when Kennedy was assassinated
Randy "Duke" Cunningham, former U.S. Congressman from California who resigned in 2005 amid a massive bribery scandal
 Gen. Donald Dawson (1932, ΒΘΠ), former aide to President Truman, Curator of the Truman Presidential Library
Hon. Harsha de Silva (MA and PhD, 1993), Sri Lankan Member of Parliament
Martin Frost (BJ 1964, ZBT), former U.S. Congressman
Nicole Galloway (Master's degree in business administration), State Auditor of Missouri
Hon. John R. Gibson (BA 1949, JD 1952, TKE, QEBH, ΟΔΚ, ΦΒΚ), Senior Judge, U.S. Court of Appeals for the Eighth Circuit
Jack Goodman (BA 1995, JD 1998), State Senator, practicing attorney in Mount Vernon, MO
Sam Graves (BS 1986, ΑΓΣ), U.S. Congressman
Bob F. Griffin (JD 1958), Speaker of Missouri House of Representatives for 15 years
Jason Grill, Missouri House of Representatives (2006–2010)
Chuck Gross (BA 1981, MPA 1982), Missouri State Senator
Kate Hanley, née Keith (BA 1965, BS 1965, ΦΒΚ), Virginia politician
Martin Heinrich (BS 1995), former U.S. Congressman and current U.S. Senator from New Mexico
Jay Houghton, Republican member of the Missouri House of Representatives
Kenny Hulshof (BA 1980, Farmhouse, Mystical 7), former U.S. Congressman
James P. Kem (1910, ΒΘΠ), United States Senate from Missouri, 1947 to 1953
Jason Klumb (JD 1993), Regional Administrator of the U.S. General Services Administration
Rush Limbaugh Sr. (1914), attorney, civic leader, Republican member of the Missouri House of Representatives, and patriarch of the Limbaugh family
Stephen N. Limbaugh Sr. (1951 ΒΘΠ), U.S. Federal District Court Judge; former president of the Missouri Bar Association
Jon Lindgren, Mayor of Fargo, North Dakota, 1978–1994; pioneering LGBT supporter
Jerry Lon Litton, (B.S. Journalism 1961, ΑΓΡ), National Secretary of the Future Farmers of America; U.S. Representative from Missouri's 6th Congressional District (1972-1976); killed in a plane crash after winning the 1976 Democratic nomination for U.S. Senator from Missouri; favored to be the Democratic nominee for President; host of the TV show Dialogue with Litton
Themba N. Masuku, Acting Prime Minister of Eswatini
Claire McCaskill (AB 1975, JD 1978, ΚΑΘ, QEBH), former Missouri State Auditor and former senior U.S. Senator from Missouri
Walter McCormick (BJ 1976; JD 1979; ΑΤΩ, ΟΔΚ, Mystical 7), President and CEO of United States Telecom Association; former general counsel of U.S. Department of Transportation; U.S. Senate Commerce Committee
 James B. Potter Jr., Los Angeles City Council member, 1963–71
 Clarke Reed, Mississippi state Republican chairman, 1966 to 1976; instrumental in the nomination of Gerald R. Ford, at the 1976 Republican National Convention in Kansas City; Greenville, Mississippi businessman
Jody Richards, Democratic member of the Kentucky House of Representatives and former speaker of the Kentucky House of Representatives 
Thomas L. Rubey (1885, ΒΘΠ), former U.S. Representative from Missouri
Sally Shelton-Colby, Ambassador to Grenada and Barbados 1979-1981
Tom Shively, Democratic member of the Missouri House of Representatives
Ram Subhag Singh, Indian politician and the first Leader of the Opposition in Lok Sabha
Ike Skelton (AB 1953, JD 1956, ΣΧ, ΦΒΚ, QEBH), former U.S. Congressman; former Chairman of the House Armed Services Committee
Kimbrough Stone (1895, ΒΘΠ), judge of the U.S. Circuit Court of Appeals, Eighth Circuit
Robert Barr Todd, Justice of the Louisiana Supreme Court
Brian Treece, Mayor of Columbia, Missouri
Carl M. Vogel, member of both houses of the Missouri State Legislature; from Jefferson City
 Kathleen Zellner, attorney

Governors
James T. Blair Jr., Missouri Governor 1957-61
Mel Carnahan, Missouri Governor 1993-2000, only person elected U.S. Senator posthumously
John M. Dalton (ΦΓΔ), Missouri Governor 1961-65
Forrest C. Donnell (ΚΣ, ΦΔΦ, ΦΒΚ, ΘΚΝ, QEBH), Missouri Governor 1945-51
Warren E. Hearnes (QEBH), Missouri Governor 1965-73, namesake of Hearnes Center
William Jayne, first Governor of Dakota Territory
Tim Kaine (QEBH), Governor of Virginia 2006-10, U.S. Senator and 2016 Democratic vice presidential nominee
Ted Kulongoski (undergraduate and law degrees), Governor of Oregon 2003-11
Jay Nixon, Missouri Governor 2009-17
Guy B. Park (ΒΘΠ), Missouri Governor 1933-37
Roger B. Wilson, Missouri Governor 2000-01

Military
 Huda Salih Mahdi Ammash (1970), member of Regional Command of the Arab Socialist Ba'ath Party – Iraq Region, chemical weapons expert
 Marcus B. Bell, U.S. Army brigadier general
 Gen. Fred F. Castle Jr. (1970 and 1977), Vietnam War and Gulf War
 Major General Roger E. Combs (1968 and 1975), Assistant Adjutant General-Air Missouri National Guard, Director of Strategic Plans and Policy (J-5), National Guard Bureau
 Gen. Enoch Crowder (1886, ΒΘΠ), Spanish–American War, Philippine–American War, World War I general
 Lt General Mark A. Ediger (1978), Surgeon General of Air Force
 Lieutenant General Charles D. Franklin (1953), commander of First United States Army from 1984 to 1987
 Brigadeführer Gustav Lombard (1913) Nazi Waffen SS, held commands in first 8th SS Cavalry Division Florian Geyer and later 31st SS Volunteer Grenadier Division, awarded Knight's Cross of Iron Cross
 Colonel Arthur D. Simons (1941), distinguished service in World War II, Korean War, and Vietnam War; ranger patriarch; leader of Son Tay Raid
 Rear Admiral Kelly E. Taggart (1955), second Director of National Oceanic and Atmospheric Administration Commissioned Officer Corps
 Lieutenant Stephen W. Thompson, first person in US military history to shoot down an enemy aircraft
 Colonel F. D. Wickham (1893, ΒΘΠ), Spanish–American War, Philippine–American War, World War I; helped found Kappa Kappa Psi band fraternity at Oklahoma A&M College

Religion

Edward N. Peters (JD, 1982), Catholic canonist and blogger

Science and technology
Huda Salih Mahdi Ammash (PhD 1983), WMD scientist for Saddam Hussein, one of 55 most wanted Iraqis post-Coalition invasion
William F. Baker (BS CiE '75), chief structural engineer of Burj Khalifa, world's tallest man-made structure
Gerald J. Fishman (BS 1965, ΑΕΠ), research astrophysicist specializing in gamma-ray astronomy
Linda Godwin (MS 1976, PhD 1980), NASA astronaut
Charles Claude Guthrie (MD 1901), American physiologist and researcher
Mary Jane Guthrie (BA 1916, MA 1918), zoologist and cancer researcher, also a University of Missouri faculty member
Ernest Lenard Hall (BS EE 1965, MS 1966, PhD 1971), roboticist
Hope Hibbard (undergraduate degree, 1916, MS 1918), biologist, cytologist, zoologist, and professor of zoology 
William Langston, founder and CEO of Parkinson's Institute and Clinical Center in Sunnyvale, California
Richard N. Richards (BS ChE 1969, ΛΧΑ), NASA astronaut
Frederick Chapman Robbins, M.D. 1954 Nobel Prize recipient, with John Enders and Thomas Weller for the cultivation of human viruses (Polio) in tissue culture
Herschel Roman (PhD 1942), early pioneer in yeast genetics
William C. Schwartz (MA 1951), physicist, laser pioneer, and founder of International Laser Systems
Thomas Jefferson Jackson See (BS 1889, Valedictorian), controversial astronomer; critic; opponent of Einstein
Harlow Shapley (AB in 1910, AM in 1911), astronomer; used RR Lyrae stars to correctly estimate size of Milky Way Galaxy and sun's position within it
Larry Smarr (BA 1970, MS 1970), physicist; founding director of the National Center for Supercomputing Applications
 William Jasper Spillman (B.S. 1886, M.S. 1890), wheat geneticist, founder, agricultural economics
Laura Sullivan-Beckers (PhD 2008), biologist
Debbye Turner (DVM 1991), veterinarian and former Miss America
Susan Golden (PhD 1983) National Academy of Sciences member and Professor of Molecular Biology at University of California, San Diego
Catharine Young (scientist), neuroscientist and science policy researcher in the Office of Science and Technology Policy
Raymond E. Zirkle (B.A.1928; Ph.D. 1932), radiobiologist and principle of the Manhattan Project

Social sciences

Thomas Swain Barclay (BA 2015, ΒΘΠ), professor of political science at Stanford University
Mark Pope (AB 1973, MEd 1974), Thomas Jefferson Professor & Curators' Distinguished Professor Emeritus of counseling at University of Missouri-St. Louis, president of the American Counseling Association (2003-2004)
Ritch Savin-Williams (BA 1971), professor of developmental psychology at Cornell University; prolific sexual orientation researcher

Other
Thomas Doty, Continental Airlines Flight 11 suicide bomber

References

See also
List of people from Columbia, Missouri

University of Missouri alumni
List of
alumni